"Ghost" is a song performed by German singer Jamie-Lee Kriewitz. The song represented Germany in the Eurovision Song Contest 2016 in Stockholm, Sweden, and was written by Thomas Burchia (better known as DJ Thomilla), Anna Leyne, and Conrad Hensel. The song was released as a digital download on 12 December 2015 through Polydor and Island Records. It was also performed as Kriewitz's winner's single during season five of The Voice of Germany.

Eurovision Song Contest

Kriewitz was announced as one of the participants in Unser Lied für Stockholm on 12 January 2016. In the final, she performed ninth and later advanced to the superfinal. She performed last in the superfinal, and was later announced as the winner with 44.5% of the tele-vote. She then represented Germany in the Eurovision Song Contest 2016. Being a member of the "Big Five", the song automatically advanced to the final, where it came in last place with 11 points.

Track listing

Charts

Release history

References

Eurovision songs of Germany
Eurovision songs of 2016
2015 songs
2015 singles
Polydor Records singles
Island Records singles